Elpidio Tovar de la Cruz (born 6 April 1949) is a Mexican politician affiliated with the Party of the Democratic Revolution. As of 2014 he served as Deputy of the LII and LIX Legislatures of the Mexican Congress as a plurinominal representative.

References

1949 births
Living people
Politicians from Nuevo León
Members of the Chamber of Deputies (Mexico)
Party of the Democratic Revolution politicians
Members of the Congress of Tamaulipas
20th-century Mexican politicians
21st-century Mexican politicians
Deputies of the LIX Legislature of Mexico